Umar Waheed (born 26 April 1994) is a Pakistani cricketer. He was the leading run-scorer for Rawalpindi in the 2018–19 Quaid-e-Azam Trophy, with 308 runs in seven matches. In September 2019, he was named in Northern's squad for the 2019–20 Quaid-e-Azam Trophy tournament.

References

External links
 

1994 births
Living people
Pakistani cricketers
National Bank of Pakistan cricketers
Rawalpindi cricketers
Cricketers from Lahore